Jonalyn: On My Own is a music album of Pinoy Pop Superstar 2005 grand champion and GMA Network talent Jonalyn Viray. It was released under GMA Records and reached Gold record status.

Track listing
"Close to Where You Are" (3:30)
Lyrics and music by Danny Tan and Dogie Simon; arranged by Danny Tan
"Di Na Mag-iisa" (Theme from The GMA Teleserye Darna) (3:52)
Lyrics and music by Jay Oliver Durias and Sharon Inductivo; arranged by Jay Oliver Durias
"If We Just Hold On" (4:19)
Lyrics and music by Vehnee Saturno and Doris Saturno; arranged by Marc Santos
"Kung Di Mo Na Mahal" (4:17)
Lyrics and music by Vehnee Saturno; arranged by Marvin Querido
"Ikaw Lang Sa Akin" (4:38)
Lyrics and music by Vehnee Saturno; arranged by Marc Santos
"Hold Me Now" (3:47)
Lyrics and music by Vehnee Saturno; arranged by Marvin Querido
"It Might Be You" (5:10)
Lyrics and music by Dave Grusin, Alan & Manilyn Bergman; arranged by Raul Mitra
"Get Here" (4:39)
Lyrics and music by Brenda Russell; arranged by Jun Tamayo
"Run to You" (4:30)
Lyrics and music by Jud Friedman and Allan Dennis Rich; arranged by Jun Tamayo
"My Miracle" (4:57)

Singles

See also
GMA Network

2005 debut albums
Jonalyn Viray albums
GMA Music albums